Söråkers FF is a Swedish football club located in Söråker.

Background
Söråkers FF currently plays in Division 4 Medelpad which is the sixth tier of Swedish football. They play their home matches at the Söråkers IP in Söråker.

The club is affiliated to Medelpads Fotbollförbund. On Saturday August 14, 2010, Söråkers FF's attendance record was set when 726 people watched the derby match between Söråkers FF and Ljustorps IF.

Season to season

Footnotes

External links
 Söråkers FF – Official website
 Söråkers FF on Facebook

Sport in Västernorrland County
Football clubs in Västernorrland County
2001 establishments in Sweden